Agathiceras anceps is a species of Agathiceras, named by Gemmellaro in 1887.

The mollusc was a fast moving nektonic carnivore and had a typical shell width of 11mm and diameter of 17 mm.

References

Agathiceratidae
Fossil taxa described in 1887